Route 366 is a highway located completely within the St. Louis metropolitan area. It is primarily a former section of U.S. Route 66. Beginning at South Broadway/South Jefferson Avenue in St. Louis and ending at the Interstate 44/Interstate 270 interchange in Sunset Hills, it was established in 1979 when US 66 was decertified between Chicago, Illinois and Joplin, Missouri.  

Through the several suburbs of St. Louis it is known as Watson Road, while in the city of St. Louis itself, it is named Chippewa Street.

History

For 20 years, Route 366 was the only non-Interstate route in the City of St. Louis maintained by the State of Missouri. It officially extended eastward only to Brannon Avenue, two blocks west of South Kingshighway Boulevard. 

In 1999, the Route 366 designation was extended east several miles, to include the remaining section of Chippewa Street that was previously part of United States Route 66 (from Chippewa to Gravois, where U.S. Route 66 had historically turned northeastward toward downtown St. Louis), as well as the section east of Gravois as far as South Broadway/South Jefferson Avenue which had never been part of U.S. Route 66.

Major intersections

References

366
366
Streets in St. Louis
Transportation in St. Louis County, Missouri